Idrettslaget Norborg is a Norwegian sports club based in the villages of Grytastranda, Søvik and Gamlem in Ålesund municipality, Sunnmøre. It was founded on Sunday 21 January 1962, and takes its name from the former municipality of Borgund; Norborg after Nordre Borgund.

Their activities include football, badminton and gymnastics. They also previously had sections for volleyball and handball (merged with Brattvåg IL – handball to form Haram Handballklubb on 16 March 1989).

Football is by far the main activity with around 200 active members. The A Team joined the league system in 1968 and played the 2016 season in the 4. divisjon.

The team has orange shirts and socks, and black shorts. They play their home games at the Uggedal stadion on grass (opened 5 June 2005). In winter 2008, they decided to open an artificial turf pitch on the gravel track at Uggedalen. This work started on 12 June 2009 and was finished in October 2009, with the pitch officially opened on 31 October with a match between the villages of Grytastranda and Søvik.

In the 2014 season, Norborg achieved their best ever finish of 13th in the 3rd division. They also achieved 9th and 10th place finishes in the 3rd division in 2009 and 2010, but at that time, the 3rd division had twice as many teams. In 2014, they were also ranked as the tenth best team in Sunnmøre.

On 27 November 2014, the club announced Stig Jacob Johansen as the new head coach.

Football
Through the majority of its existence, the sports club's football team has played in the amateur regional divisions (4. divisjon and lower) of the Norwegian football league system, with the occasional brief promotions to 3. divisjon. 

Coaches: Robert V. Iversen and Sigmund Gjerset 1968, Sigmund Gjerset 1969, xx 1970, Sverre Sørgård 1971, Sigmund Gjerset 1972, Kåre Dalhaug  1973, Sigmund Gjerset 1974, Per Indrestrand 1975, Oddvar Aarø 1976, Per Giske  1977, Sigmund Gjerset, Arild Vegsund and John Tellefsen 1978, Per Skotte 1979–81,  Steinar Hildremyr 1982, Per Skotte 1983, Sigmund Gjerset and Arild Vegsund 1984,  Ole Petter Aarsund 1985, Hans Magnar Engeset and Kåre Nogva 1986, Sigmund  Gjerset, Svein Gjerset, Helge Uggedal and Arild Vegsund 1987, Helge Uggedal  1988–89, Per Skotte 1990, Øyvind Grytten 1991, Arne Rønstad 1992, Øystein Haugan  and Malvin Alstadsæter 1993, Hans Magnar Engeset, Frode Urke and Malvin  Alstadsæter 1994, Ivar Roald 1995–96, Bjarte Steinsbu and Ivar Roald 1997, Øyvind  Grytten 1998, Sindre Hildre 1999-03, Øystein Haugan 2004–05, Jan Egil  Alstadsæter 2006–07, Ivar Roald  2008–10; Kristian Søviknes 2011; Roger Grytten 2012; Oddmund Davik Otterlei 2013–14; Stig Jacob Johansen 2015–

References

External links
 

Sport in Møre og Romsdal
Sports clubs established in 1962
Football clubs in Norway
Association football clubs established in 1962
Sport in Ålesund